Ulla Irmeli Pursiheimo (born May 4, 1944) is a Finnish mathematician who became the first female mathematics professor in Finland. Her areas of interest in mathematics include mathematical optimization, control theory, search games, and later in her career mathematics education.

Pursiheimo earned her doctorate from the University of Turku in 1971.
She became a full professor of mathematics at the University of Turku in 1974, and retired to become a professor emerita in 1999.

References

Finnish mathematicians
Women mathematicians
University of Turku alumni
Academic staff of the University of Turku
1944 births
Living people